The Royal Academy of Science, Letters and Fine Arts of Belgium (sometimes referred to as ) is the independent learned society of science and arts of the French Community of Belgium. One of Belgium's numerous academies, it is the French-speaking counterpart of the Royal Flemish Academy of Belgium for Science and the Arts. In 2001 both academies founded a joint association for the purpose of promoting science and arts on an international level: The Royal Academies for Science and the Arts of Belgium (RASAB). All three institutions are located in the same building, the Academy Palace in Brussels.

History
A preexisting literary society was founded in 1769 under the auspices of Karl von Cobenzl, plenipotentiary of the Austrian Netherlands under Empress Maria Theresa (hence its nickname ""). In 1772 Cobenzl's successor Georg Adam, Prince of Starhemberg continued the efforts of his predecessor by expanding the society to a scientific academy. This academy was granted the right to bear the title of Imperial and Royal Academy of Science and Letters of Brussels by Empress Letters Patent dated 16 December 1772. The sovereign instructed the academics to animate the intellectual life of the country and to stimulate and coordinate scientific research in a wide variety of fields.

This institution did not survive the occupation by the French of the Austrian Netherlands, and the academy held its last plenary session on 21 May 1794.

William I, king of the United Kingdom of the Netherlands since 1815, reinstituted the academy by Royal Decree of 17 May 1816 on the title of Royal Academy of Sciences and Letters. Work was restarted with 8 remaining academics associated with other Dutch and Belgian fellow-members. Its legal personality is recognised by the law of 2 August 1924.

Belgian Academy 
After the 1830 Belgian Revolution, the Academy found its permanent place in the social order and on 1 December 1845 Leopold I of Belgium named it . He set up three classes: science, letters and fine arts, each with 30 members of Belgian nationality. Confirm Art. 2 the King is Royal Patron, and bestows membership.
 Founding members: Nicaise de Keyser, Eugène Simonis, Louis Gallait, Jan August Hendrik Leys, Jean-Baptiste Madou, François-Joseph Navez, Henri van der Haert, Eugène Joseph Verboeckhoven, Gustaf Wappers, Guillaume Geefs, Joseph-Pierre Braemt, Tilman-François Suys, Louis Roelandt, Charles Auguste de Bériot, François-Joseph Fétis, Théodore-Gérard Hanssen and Henri Vieuxtemps.

The bilingual status of the Royal Academy however caused difficulties over the course of the years, which ultimately were resolved in 1971 by splitting the academy into two independent monolingual entities. The law of 1 July 1971 put both academies in linguistic equality: henceforth their own lingua franca is used (respectively the French and the Dutch) and they bear the same denomination. In 1999 the Dutch-speaking academy changed its name to "Royal Flemish Academy of Belgium for Science and the Arts".

Organization and members
The academy is divided into four major classes and assemblies are held monthly:

Class of Sciences: mathematical, physical, chemical, biological, geological sciences and related disciplines;
Class of Letters and moral and political sciences:  history, archeology, letters, philosophy, moral and political sciences, sociology, economy, law, psychology and economy.
Class of Arts: painting, architecture and sculpture, music, cinematographic and audiovisual arts, performing arts, history of art, art criticism.
Class of Technical Sciences: various engineering resulting from sciences  including their impact on society.

Each class is composed of 50 members and 50 foreign members.

Location

The Academy is headquartered in the Academy Palace (Paleis der Academiën (Dutch) / Palais des Académies (French)), which is on Hertogsstraat (Dutch) / Rue Ducale (French) in Brussels.

By a royal decree of 30 April 1876, the Palace was put at the disposition of the two existing Belgian academies, the Royal Academy of Science, Letters and Fine Arts of Belgium and the Académie royale de Médecine de Belgique (fr) founded in 1841. Three further academies came to share the space: the Académie royale de Langue et de Littérature françaises (fr), founded in 1920 by Jules Destrée; in 1938 the Koninklijke Vlaamse Academie voor Wetenschappen, Letteren en Schone Kunsten van België as independent Dutch-language academy (now the Royal Flemish Academy of Belgium for Science and the Arts) and the Koninklijke Academie voor Geneeskunde van België (nl) (Dutch counterpart of Académie royale de Médecine de Belgique in French i.e. Royal Society of Medicine of Belgium) also founded in 1938.

Permanent secretaries
The lead director is a permanent secretary. Since November 2007, the secretary is Hervé Hasquin.

Prizes and awards
Many scientific and art prizes (fr) are awarded each year in different kinds of subjects.

RASAB membership
Since its foundation in 2001 the Royal Academy of Science, Letters and Fine Arts of Belgium has been a member of RASAB (the Royal Academies for Science and the Arts of Belgium) – along with its Dutch-speaking sister-academy KVAB – in order to coordinate and promote the 25 National Scientific Committees and the international activities in Belgium.

Presidents 
1773: Joseph de Crumpipen
1816 – 1820: Baron Guillaume de Feltz
1820 – 1832 : Charles-Alexandre, 3rd Prince de Gavre
 1835: Baron Goswin de Stassart
 1836
 1837: Baron Goswin de Stassart
 1838
 1839: Baron Goswin de Stassart
 1840
 1841: Baron Goswin de Stassart
 1842
 1845: Baron Goswin de Stassart
 1844: Baron Goswin de Stassart
 1847: Baron Goswin de Stassart
 1853: Baron Goswin de Stassart
 1870: Gustave Dewalque
 1874: Nicaise De Keyser
 1876: Henri Alexis Brialmont
 2010: Pierre Bartholomée
 2016: Charles J. Joachain
 2017: Monique Mund-Dopchie

Famous members 

See also
 Science and technology in Belgium
 Royal Institute for Cultural Heritage
 Culture of Belgium
 Science and technology in Flanders
 Belgian literature

References

External links
 ARB Website
 KVAB Website
RASAB Website

Belgium
Scientific organisations based in Belgium
Belgium
Organisations based in Belgium with royal patronage